The University of Delaware Press (UDP) is a publishing house and a department of the University of Delaware in the United States, whose main campus is at Newark, Delaware, where the University Press is also based.

Established in the early 1970s, the UDP published few books until 1975, when it joined the Associated University Presses (AUP) consortium. This allowed the UDP to choose works to publish under its imprint and control, while the AUP takes charge of  production and distribution. When Associated University Presses ceased most new publishing in 2010, a new distribution agreement was struck with Rowman & Littlefield.

The University of Delaware Press publishes books in all scholarly fields, but its strengths are in literary studies, eighteenth century studies, French literature, history, the history of art, and studies of Delaware and the Eastern Shore.

See also

 List of English-language book publishing companies
 List of university presses

External links
 Official site

Delaware
Press
Mass media in Delaware
Publishing companies established in 1971
1971 establishments in Delaware